Elizabeth Reynolds may refer to:

Elizabeth Walker (artist) (1800–1876), née Reynolds
Elizabeth Reynolds, a leader of the 1887 Bloody Sunday protest
Liz Reynolds, a character in One Life to Live 
Elizabeth Reynolds, a character in Snapped
Elizabeth Reynolds, a character in The Road West
Elizabeth Reynolds, also known as Elizabeth Devereux-Rochester, an agent of the Special Operations Executive in World War II